Jeong Hye-jeong (born 5 January 1997) is a South Korean rower. She competed in the 2020 Summer Olympics.

References

1997 births
Living people
South Korean female rowers
Olympic rowers of South Korea
Rowers at the 2020 Summer Olympics